The first Philadelphia Koreatown is located around the Olney section of the city of Philadelphia, United States. Since the late 1980s, the Korean community has expanded northward, and it now straddles the border between North Philadelphia in Philadelphia proper and the northern suburb of Cheltenham, although many Korean-American businesses and organizations and some residents remain in Olney and adjoining neighborhoods. Upper Darby Township, bordering West Philadelphia, also has a large Korean-American population; meanwhile, a rapidly growing Korean population and commercial presence has emerged in suburban Cherry Hill, New Jersey since 2010, centered along Marlton Pike, attracted to the Cherry Hill Public Schools. Signage in Hangul is ubiquitous in some neighborhoods in these areas.

History
According to The Philadelphia Inquirer, the Koreatown had "moved" from the Logan neighborhood into the Olney section in the early 1980s, attributing the migration from Logan to "too much crime" and the "schools weren't so good" at the time in Logan. In Olney, tensions were high between Koreans and the German community, as well as the black community, who did not want the section of the town to be officially declared "Koreatown", causing much violence and crime to be committed not only against Koreans, but East Asians in general. The original Koreatown existed on North 5th Street in Olney since 1984, with Korean language signs put up to help official recognition of the area; those signs were vandalized in the late 1980s.

Religion
There is a Korean Catholic church, Holy Angels.

See also

 Koreatown
 Korean American
 Chinatown, Philadelphia
 Little Saigon, Philadelphia
 Upper Darby Township, Delaware County, Pennsylvania
 Millbourne, Pennsylvania
 Cheltenham Township, Pennsylvania
 Cherry Hill, New Jersey
 Koreatown, Palisades Park (벼랑 공원 코리아타운)
 Koreatown, Fort Lee (포트 리 코리아타운)
 List of U.S. cities with significant Korean-American populations

Gallery

References

External links
 N. 5th Street Project official website

Neighborhoods in Philadelphia
Asian-American culture in Pennsylvania
Koreatowns in the United States
Korean-American culture in Pennsylvania
Olney-Oak Lane, Philadelphia